TCR may stand for:

Arts and entertainment
 TCR, the musical project of Robin Moulder and TC Smith
 "TCR", a single by Prolapse
 The Comic Reader, a comics news-fanzine 1961–1984

Businesses and organizations
 TCR (record label), or Thursday Club Records
 TCR International, an airport ground support equipment supplier company
 TCR fm, British radio station
 The Climate Registry, a North American nonprofit collaboration to record and track greenhouse gas emissions
 Toronto Civic Railways, Canada
 Total Control Racing,  a toy brand from the late 1970s
 Lanaes Aereas Trans Costa Rica, ICAO airline code TCR

Places
 Theatre Cedar Rapids, is a community theatre in Cedar Rapids, Iowa, U.S.
 Tottenham Court Road, a major road in Central London

Science and technology
 Teachers College Record, an academic journal of education
 Transmission control room, a room found at broadcast facilities and television stations
 T-cell receptor, a molecule found on the surface of some immune cells
 Total Core Recovery, an expression used to qualify the quality of a rock mass in boreholes
 Thyristor controlled reactor, a device in electric power transmission systems
 Temperature coefficient of resistance, measured by a Microbolometer
 Transcription coupled nucleotide excision repair (TC-NER or TCR), a DNA repair mechanism
 Token Curated Registries or TCR, lists (of anything) whose order and content are arbitrated in a decentralized way with virtuous incentives to avoid their manipulation.

Sport
 TCR Touring Car, a touring car racing specification
 TCR International Series, an international touring car series
 Transcontinental Race, an annual, self-supported, ultra-distance cycling race across Europe
 Total Compact Road bicycle by Giant Bicycles

Transport
 Thrissur railway station, code TCR, Kerala, India
 Tottenham Court Road tube station, a London Underground and Crossrail station serving and named for the road
 Tuticorin Airport, Tamil Nadu, India, IATA code TCR